Rajura is a town  and municipal council in the Chandrapur district of the Indian state of Maharashtra.

Geography
The town has an average elevation of 189 metres (624 feet).

Demographics
According to the 2021 Indian census, Rajura had a population of 134,838  Literate people are 74,225 out of 41,521 are male and 32,704 are female. Children under age six constitute about 15 percent of the population. Rajura's average literacy rate of 72 percent (77 percent of males, 67 percent of females) exceeds the national average of 59.5 percent. Nearby towns include Ballarpur, Gadchandur, Nanda and Korpana.

Industries
Rajura is in the heart of Maharashtra's coal and cement-producing areas. Due to the availability of raw materials, there are a number of cement factories near the town.

Places of interest
A number of temples are in and near Rajura. They include the Hanuman temple near the lake in Jogapur, about 10 km (6.2 mi) from Rajura, and the Shri Saibaba temple (Chota Shirdi) on the Wardha River. The Somnath Mandir temple is in Somanathapur region.

See also 
 List of talukas in Chandrapur district
 List of village in Rajura taluka

References

Cities and towns in Chandrapur district
Talukas in Maharashtra